is a 1983 Mecha anime television series produced by Sunrise, loosely based on Jules Verne's novel Deux ans de vacances. It was officially drafted by Yoshiyuki Tomino, the creator of Mobile Suit Gundam and planned by both Takeyuki Kanda (who also serves as its director) and Hiroyuki Hoshiyama. It aired at both MBS and TBS from October 21, 1983, to September 8, 1984.

Plot
In the far-flung future of 2058, hostile alien forces (collectively known as the "Astrogaters") attack the human colony at Clayad, the third planet of the Ypserlon system, which is located 43 light years away from Earth. Because of this, the colonists on Clayad are evacuated from the planet by the human military. During the confusion, some of the human children become stranded from their parents and escape in the training combat space ship, the Janous. With the help of the ship's defense systems, they manage to arrive at Belwick, the fourth planet of the system, where other humans supposedly live. However, upon arriving they discover that the colony at Belwick had already been destroyed by the enemies too. Learning to pilot the VIFAMs and other mecha, the 13 children decide to escape to Earth by themselves.

On their way to Earth, they discover a damaged alien ship piloted by a friendly Astrogater. From him they learn that one of the children is actually an alien as well; their parents have been captured and taken to the Astrogater home planet Kukto's artificial satellite, Tuat. After numerous battles with Astrogaters (or Kuktonians as they call themselves), and receiving some help from Earth military forces, they manage to reach Tuat. One of the children is captured and taken prisoner on Tuat where he learns that there is a rebel faction among the Kuktonians and effects an escape with the help of the imprisoned rebels. After liberating the alien prisoners, the children learn that their parents have been moved planet side to Kukto, where they make an attempt to rescue them.

Characters

Production
The series was conceived by Gundam creator Yoshiyuki Tomino and directed by Takeyuki Kanda. It included mechanical designs by artists Kunio Okawara (who previously designed mecha for the Mobile Suit Gundam anime series) and Mamoru Nagano, as well as character designs by the late Toyoo Ashida (famous for his work in Magical Princess Minky Momo).

The show's intro theme, "Hello Vifam", was composed and sung by Japanese artist David Mann, with lyrics by Jeanette Mann, and performed by the progressive rock band TAO. The theme is one of the first Japanese anime title songs written entirely in English.

Galactic Drifter Vifam premiered in Japan on Japan News Network's television stations (including MBS and TBS) between October 21, 1983, and September 8, 1984.

A remake of the series, aired on MBS and its affiliated networks between March 21, 1998, and October 3, 1998.

The first series was also later re-run in Japan on Animax on December 23, 2006.

Video game
There was a video game adaptation, also entitled Ginga Hyoryuu Vifam, released by Bandai for the MSX computer platform in 1984. It was an action game and space combat simulator that uses 3D wire-frame graphics.

The game allowed the player to explore open space while switching between three monitors, each one displaying a different perspective. The first monitor displays a top-down perspective used mainly for navigation, the second monitor displays a first-person perspective which can be used to explore through space or engage enemies in first-person shooter combat, and the third monitor is used for servicing the player's mecha.

The game also implemented an early physics engine where approaching a planet's gravitational field pulls the player towards it; if the player gets caught in a gravity field, they must accelerate out of the gravity field in a close-up view. The game also uses a radar that displays the relative positions of the player and enemies as well as the destination.

References

External links
  Official site
 
 
 
 
 
 
 

1983 anime television series debuts
1984 anime OVAs
1985 anime OVAs
1998 anime television series debuts
Mainichi Broadcasting System original programming
Mecha anime and manga
Sunrise (company)
Bandai Namco franchises